In Due Time is the 2004 debut studio album by Submersed, a hard rock band from Stephenville, Texas. The album was originally titled All Things Becoming of the End. The album was recorded and mixed, but eventually scrapped and renamed as the band began writing new material that they felt was far better. The song "Divide the Hate" was featured on the video game NASCAR 2005: Chase for the Cup.

Track listing
 "Hollow" (Carpenter, Davis, Friedman, Luker) – 4:04
 "To Peace" (Carpenter, Davis, Friedman, Luker, Gilmore) – 4:06
 "In Due Time"  (Carpenter, Davis, Friedman, Luker, Gilmore) – 4:03
 "Dripping" (Carpenter, Davis, Friedman, Luker, Hissem) – 4:38
 "Flicker" (Carpenter, Friedman, Luker) – 5:16
 "Parallelism" (Carpenter, Davis, Luker) – 3:47
 "Deny Me" (Carpenter, Davis, Friedman, Luker) – 3:34
 "You Run" (Carpenter, Davis, Friedman, Luker, Gilmore, Young) – 4:09
 "Divide the Hate" (Carpenter, Davis, Friedman, Luker, Gilmore) – 4:27
 "Piano Song" (Carpenter) – 3:56
 "Unconcerned" (Carpenter, Friedman, Hissem) – 5:16

Personnel
Musicians
 Donald Carpenter – vocals, piano
 Eric Friedman – lead guitar, backup vocals
 TJ Davis – rhythm guitar
 Kelan Luker – bass
 Garrett Whitlock – drums (only on songs 1, 2, 3, 8, and 9)

Session musicians
 Scott Phillips – drums, percussion (only on tracks 4, 5, 6, 7, 10, and 11)
 Kirk Kelsey – mandolin, keyboards
 Mark Tremonti – Guitar intro on "Flicker"

Album production
 Kirk Kelsey – producer (only on tracks 4, 5, 6, 7, 10, and 11)
 Mark Tremonti – producer (only on tracks 4, 5, 6, 7, 10, and 11)
 Don Gilmore – producer (only on songs 1, 2, 3, 8, and 9)

Other credits
 Joaquin Cortez – Album artwork

All Things Becoming of the End
In Due Time was originally titled All Things Becoming of the End. The album was recorded and mixed, but eventually scrapped and renamed as the band began writing new material that they felt was far better.

Original track listing
 "Complicated"
 "Dripping"
 "You Run"
 "Divide the Hate"
 "Unconcerned"
 "Deny Me"
 "Broken Man"
 "Flicker"
 "The Piano Song"
 "Leave"
 "Come to Me"

 Note that some of these songs were not included in the official release of In Due Time, as they were replaced by other songs.

Trivia
The album's cover displays a clock whose digits are composed of Roman numerals; the digit in the nine's place, however, is an eleven.

The song "Divide the Hate" was featured in NASCAR SimRacing and NASCAR 2005: Chase for the Cup.

References

External links

2004 albums
Submersed albums